Joseph William Royer (1873–1954) was a prolific architect from Urbana, Illinois who designed many prominent buildings in Urbana, Champaign, and beyond. His work included civic, educational, commercial, and residential buildings, many of which are listed in the National Register of Historic Places and feature a wide variety of architectural styles.

Early life and education

Joseph Royer was born in Urbana on August 2, 1873. He attended Urbana High School and then attended the University of Illinois, graduating with a degree in civil engineering in 1895.

Professional career

From 1898 to 1906, Royer worked as Urbana's city engineer. As the city engineer, he designed the Champaign County Courthouse, which brought him local recognition for the first time. In 1905, Royer formed an architecture firm named Royer and Brown, that was later named Royer and Smith; Royer, Danely, and Smith; and Royer and Davis. The firm continued successful until Royer's death in 1954, with approximately 100 projects attributed to it.

Personal residence

In 1905, Royer designed his own house, located in Urbana at 801 W. Oregon Street, that he would live in for the rest of his life. It is an eight-bedroom mission style house, thought to be inspired by the "California Building" at the St. Louis World's Fair in 1904. Next to this house, Royer designed a house to be built in 1923 for his mother-in-law, in English cottage revival style. Both of these houses are protected by the city of Urbana as part of the Royer Historic District.

Several of his works are listed, for their architecture, on the U.S. National Register of Historic Places (NRHP).

Work

Works include (with attribution):
Alpha Rho Chi Fraternity House, Champaign
Alpha Xi Delta Sorority Chapter House, Champaign
Bloom High School, Chicago Heights
Clay County Courthouse
Dixon High School
Franklin County Jail
Grundy County Courthouse, Morris
Jay Helms House, Rockingham, North Carolina
Illinois Traction Building, Champaign
Linn County Courthouse (Iowa)
Linn County Jail (Iowa)
Marion County Courthouse (Illinois)
Piatt County Courthouse, Monticello
Urbana Free Library
Urbana High School
Urbana Lincoln Hotel
Warren County Courthouse (Indiana)

References

Further reading

1873 births
1954 deaths
People from Urbana, Illinois
Champaign, Illinois
20th-century American architects
Grainger College of Engineering alumni
19th-century American architects
University of Illinois alumni
Architects from Illinois
Urbana, Illinois